Fairview Township is the name of some places in the U.S. state of Pennsylvania:

 Fairview Township, Butler County, Pennsylvania
 Fairview Township, Erie County, Pennsylvania
 Fairview Township, Luzerne County, Pennsylvania
 Fairview Township, Mercer County, Pennsylvania
 Fairview Township, York County, Pennsylvania

See also 
 Fairview, Pennsylvania (disambiguation)
 Fairfield Township, Pennsylvania (disambiguation)
 Fairhope Township, Somerset County, Pennsylvania
 Fairmount Township, Luzerne County, Pennsylvania
 Fairview Township (disambiguation)

Pennsylvania township disambiguation pages